The 2022 Enjoy Illinois 300 was a NASCAR Cup Series race that was held on June 5, 2022, at World Wide Technology Raceway in Madison, Illinois. The 15th race of the 2022 NASCAR Cup Series season, it was contested over 245 laps – extended from 240 laps due to an overtime finish, on the 1.25-mile (2.01 km) paved oval motor racing track.

Report

Background
World Wide Technology Raceway (formerly Gateway International Raceway and Gateway Motorsports Park) is a motorsport racing facility in Madison, Illinois, just east of St. Louis, Missouri, United States, close to the Gateway Arch. It features a 1.25-mile (2 kilometer) oval that hosts the NASCAR Cup Series, NASCAR Camping World Truck Series, and the NTT IndyCar Series, a  infield road course used by the SCCA, Porsche Club of America, and various car clubs, and a quarter-mile drag strip that hosts the annual NHRA Midwest Nationals event.

On September 15, 2021, it was announced WWT Raceway at Gateway would be added to the NASCAR Cup Series schedule for the first time for the 2022 season.

Entry list
 (R) denotes rookie driver.
 (i) denotes driver who is ineligible for series driver points.

Practice

Practice results

Qualifying

Qualifying results

Race

Stage Results

Stage One
Laps: 45

Stage Two
Laps: 95

Final Stage Results

Stage Three
Laps: 100

Race statistics
 Lead changes: 12 among 9 different drivers
 Cautions/Laps: 10 for 53
 Red flags: 0
 Time of race: 3 hours, 7 minutes and 34 seconds
 Average speed:

Media

Television
Fox Sports covered the race on the television side. Mike Joy, Clint Bowyer, and Michael Waltrip called the race from the broadcast booth, with Kenny Wallace joining for Stage 2. Jamie Little and Regan Smith handled pit road for the television side, and Larry McReynolds provided insight from the Fox Sports studio in Charlotte.  On the drive to his dealerships in Emporia, Kansas, Bowyer was involved that night in fatal crash where his car struck an impaired motorist in Osage Beach, Missouri that evening.  Because of an investigation into the incident, Bowyer was on leave for legal issues and did not make the trip to Sonoma for the ensuing week's race.

Radio
MRN had the radio call for the race and was simulcasted on Sirius XM NASCAR Radio. Alex Hayden, Jeff Striegle, and Rusty Wallace called the race for MRN from the booth when the field raced down the front straightaway. Dave Moody called the race from turns 1 & 2 while Kurt Becker called the race from turns 3 & 4. Pit Road for MRN was manned by Steve Post Brienne Pedigo and Chris Wilner.

Standings after the race

Drivers' Championship standings

Manufacturers' Championship standings

Note: Only the first 16 positions are included for the driver standings.
. – Driver has clinched a position in the NASCAR Cup Series playoffs.

Notes

References

Enjoy Illinois 300
Enjoy Illinois 300
NASCAR races at Gateway Motorsports Park
Enjoy Illinois 300